Pleasantville is an unincorporated community in New Castle County, Delaware, United States. Pleasantville is located on Delaware Route 273, west of New Castle.

References

External links

Unincorporated communities in New Castle County, Delaware
Unincorporated communities in Delaware